Johann Joachim Faber (12 April 1778 in Hamburg – 2 August 1846 in Hamburg) was a landscape painter who was born in Hamburg. He worked originally at historical subjects, and painted the altar-piece, Suffer Little Children to come unto Me, for St. Catharine's Church at Hamburg. On his journey to Italy in company with J. A. Koch and Reinhardt, he was induced to adopt landscape painting, in which line he is best known. The Berlin Gallery contains a View of the Capuchin Monastery, near Naples, by him (1830). He died in Hamburg in 1846.

See also
 List of German painters

References
 

1778 births
1846 deaths
18th-century German painters
18th-century German male artists
German male painters
19th-century German painters
19th-century German male artists
German landscape painters
Artists from Hamburg